Manickapuram is a village in Palladam Taluk in Tiruppur District of the Indian state of Tamil Nadu. It is located 19 km (11.8 miles) south of District headquartersTiruppur. 465 km (288.9 miles) from Chennai

Demographics  
Tamil is the main language.

Politics in Manickapuram 
KNMK, DMK , ADMK , AIADMK are the major political parties.

References 

Cities and towns in Tiruppur district